Klakknabben Peak is a low isolated peak  northeast of Gavlpiggen Peak, just north of the Kirwan Escarpment in Queen Maud Land, Antarctica. It was mapped by Norwegian cartographers from surveys and air photos by Norwegian–British–Swedish Antarctic Expedition (1949–52) and from additional air photos (1958–59), and named Klakknabben (the lump peak).

References

Mountains of Queen Maud Land
Princess Martha Coast